Nicolas Jean Baptiste Poilly (1712–1780) was a French draftsman and engraver. His work is held in the collection of the Cooper-Hewitt, National Design Museum and the National Portrait Gallery, London.

References

1712 births
1780 deaths
French draughtsmen
French engravers